Tafraout, also Tafraoute (Shilha ) is a town in Tiznit Province, Souss-Massa region, Morocco, in the central part of the Anti-Atlas mountains. It had a population of 4,931 at the 2004 census.

Name and etymology
The basic meaning of the Shilha feminine noun tafrawt is "basin or cistern in which water drawn from a well is poured", with a derived meaning "valley". The centre of the town of Tafraout is actually situated in a small valley, at the foot of Djebel Lekest, a pink granite mountain formed by erosion. A male inhabitant is called in Shilha "u Tfrawt", (plural "ayt Tfrawt"); a female inhabitant is "ult Tfrawt", (plural "ist Tfrawt").

See also
Tughrassen

Notes

References

External links

Populated places in Tiznit Province
Municipalities of Morocco